Madhu Bangarappa is an Indian politician, producer and actor from Karnataka. Karnataka state Congress declared him as OBC president of state.

Personal life
Madhu Bangarappa was born to former Chief Minister of Karnataka late S. Bangarappa and late Shakuntala Bangarappa. He has an elder brother Kumar Bangarappa and 3 sisters. One of the sisters is Geetha Shivarajkumar.

Political career
S. Madhu Bangarappa was a Janata Dal (Secular) Political party Member of Legislative Assembly elected from the Sorab constituency. He was also candidate for the Shimoga seat Lok sabha by-polls 2018. 
Madhu Bangarappa joined Indian National Congress on 30 July 2021.

Film career
Madhu has produced Kannada feature films such as Belliyappa Bangarappa (1992) which were big blockbuster hits in which his brother Kumar Bangarappa has appeared and co-produced.

Filmography

Source :

References

External links
 http://myneta.info/karnataka2013/candidate.php?candidate_id=483
 http://www.thehindu.com/news/national/karnataka/madhu-bangarappa-is-jds-chief-whip/article5231178.ece

Year of birth missing (living people)
Living people
Karnataka MLAs 2013–2018
Janata Dal (Secular) politicians
Samajwadi Party politicians
Producers who won the Best Film on National Integration National Film Award